Cavite's 8th congressional district is one of the eight congressional districts of the Philippines in Cavite. It has been represented in the House of Representatives of the Philippines since 2019. Previously included in Cavite's 7th congressional district, it was created in 2018 when General Trias was granted its own district, it being assigned as the new 6th district, and having remnants of the old 7th district at the new 8th district. It consists of the southern city of Tagaytay and the municipalities of Alfonso, General Emilio Aguinaldo, Magallanes, Maragondon, Mendez, Naic, and Ternate. It is currently represented in the 19th Congress by Aniela Bianca Tolentino of the National Unity Party.

Representation history

Election results

2022

2019

See also
Legislative districts of Cavite

References

Congressional districts of the Philippines
Politics of Cavite
2018 establishments in the Philippines
Congressional districts of Calabarzon
Constituencies established in 2018